Richard Graydon (12 May 1922 – 22 December 2014) was a British stunt performer and stunt coordinator best known for his work in the James Bond film series.

Early life
He was educated at Stowe School in Buckinghamshire and was an amateur jockey and a dancer. He was rejected for service in the RAF in World War II due to a childhood eye injury.

Career
His acting, dancing and horse-riding skills were used to good effect in the 1952 film The Story of Robin Hood and His Merrie Men, and he then developed a career as a stunt performer. His stunts for James Bond films included tobogganing down the Cresta Run in On Her Majesty's Secret Service, doubling for George Lazenby, and later for Roger Moore in a cable car fight scene 1,000 ft above ground on Sugarloaf Mountain, Brazil, in Moonraker. At  in height, Graydon was  shorter than Moore, but it was necessary to maintain the height difference with the stuntman doubling for the  Richard Kiel, who played Jaws. In the scene, he had to fall and then hold on to the roof of the cable car with his hands and did not have his safety harness on. His left hand slipped off the roof but he held on one-handed until he could regain his grip. He became known for his ability to hang onto things high above the ground and was selected for stunts that required that skill.

He married in 1970 and died in December 2014, aged 92.

Selective stunt filmography

Selective actor filmography

References

External links
 

English stunt performers
1922 births
2014 deaths
People educated at Stowe School
British male film actors